The People's Revolutionary Party of Vietnam was a political party in South Vietnam established in 1962. It provided leadership for the Việt Cộng uprising. In 1976, the party was merged with the Workers' Party of Vietnam in North Vietnam to form the Communist Party of Vietnam.

The PRP was founded on January 1, 1962. Its foundation was publicly announced by Radio Hanoi on January 18, 1962. The stated goals of the party was to combat imperialism, feudalism and colonialism. PRP was not an explicitly communist party, but according to the January 18 Radio Hanoi broadcast, it represented the Marxist–Leninists in South Vietnam. PRP was led by a Central Committee, often referred to as the Central Office for South Vietnam (COSVN). The smallest organizational unit of PRP was the cell. 1-7 cells constituted a chi bo, the street or hamlet level organization of the party. PRP was the leading force in the National Liberation Front (Vietcong). Both at national and local levels PRP committees led the NLF work. In the Central Committee there were three main responsibilities, Military Commissar (coordinating the relations with the North Vietnamese Army), NLF control and general administration. Võ Chí Công was party chairman.

References

1962 establishments in South Vietnam
1975 disestablishments in Vietnam
Communist parties in Vietnam
Defunct political parties in Vietnam
History of the Communist Party of Vietnam
Political parties disestablished in 1975
Political parties established in 1962
Viet Cong